George Michael Standing (born August 3, 1941) is a Canadian former professional ice hockey player who played two games in the National Hockey League with the Minnesota North Stars during the 1967–68 season. The rest of his career, which lasted from 1962 to 1972, was spent in various minor leagues.

Career statistics

Regular season and playoffs

External links
 

1941 births
Living people
Canadian ice hockey right wingers
Guelph Royals players
Jacksonville Rockets players
Memphis South Stars players
Minnesota North Stars players
Nashville Dixie Flyers players
North Bay Trappers (EPHL) players
St. Catharines Teepees players
Ice hockey people from Toronto
Suncoast Suns (EHL) players
Toronto Marlboros players